Harpalus aenigma is a species of ground beetle in the subfamily Harpalinae. It was described by Tschitscherine in 1897.

References

aenigma
Beetles described in 1897